A fleuron, also known as printers' flower, is a typographic element, or glyph, used either as a punctuation mark or as an ornament for typographic compositions. Robert Bringhurst in The Elements of Typographic Style calls the forms "horticultural dingbats". It is also known as an aldus leaf (after Italian Renaissance printer Aldus Manutius).

History

Flower decorations are among the oldest typographic ornaments.  A fleuron can also be used to fill the white space that results from the indentation of the first line of a paragraph, on a line by itself to divide paragraphs in a highly stylized way, to divide lists, or for pure ornamentation. The fleuron (as a formal glyph) is an sixteenth century introduction.

Fleurons were crafted the same way as other typographic elements were: as individual metal sorts that could be fit into the printer's compositions alongside letters and numbers. This saved the printer time and effort in producing ornamentation. Because the sorts could be produced in multiples, printers could build up borders with repeating patterns of fleurons.

Fleurons in Unicode 

Thirty forms of fleuron have code points in Unicode.  The Dingbats and Miscellaneous Symbols blocks have three fleurons that the standard calls "floral hearts" (also called "aldus leaf", "ivy leaf", "hedera" and "vine leaf"); twenty-four fleurons (from the pre-Unicode Wingdings and Wingdings 2 fonts) in the Ornamental Dingbats block; and three more fleurons used in archaic languages are also supported.

  (Miscellaneous Symbols)
  (Dingbats)
  (Dingbats)
 
 
 
  (Ornamental Dingbats)

Gallery

See also
 
 , a printers' ornament
 , mostly used as a sub-chapter section break. Although a group of asterisks is the most common style, fleurons are also seen fulfilling this role.
 The Fleuron, a British typography magazine from the early 20th century.

References

External links 

 Book cover printed using fleuron designs

Typographical symbols
Flowers in culture